The 46th Golden Globe Awards, honoring the best in film and television for 1988, were held on January 28, 1989, at the Beverly Hilton. The nominations were announced on January 4, 1989.

Winners and nominees

Film 

The following films received multiple nominations:

The following films received multiple wins:

Television 

The following programs received multiple nominations:

The following programs received multiple wins:

Ceremony

Presenters 

 Anne Archer
 James Brolin
 Phil Collins
 Michael Douglas
 Clint Eastwood
 Valeria Golino
 Linda Gray
 Harry Hamlin
 Dennis Hopper
 Shelley Long
 Carrie Mitchum
 Christopher Mitchum
 Robert Mitchum
 Randy Quaid
 Eric Roberts
 Gena Rowlands
 Peter Strauss
 Richard Widmark

Cecil B. DeMille Award 
Doris Day

Miss Golden Globe 
Kyle Atletter (daughter to Frank Aletter & Lee Meriwether)

See also
 61st Academy Awards
 9th Golden Raspberry Awards
 40th Primetime Emmy Awards
 41st Primetime Emmy Awards
 42nd British Academy Film Awards
 43rd Tony Awards
 1988 in film
 1988 in American television

References

046
1988 film awards
1988 television awards
January 1989 events in the United States
Golden